Yanbei Subdistrict is a subdistrict in Chengguan District, Lanzhou, Gansu, China. , it administers the following three residential neighborhoods and two villages:
 Neighborhoods
 Yantan Daqiao Community
 Yantan Road Community
 Yanxi Road Community

 Villages 
 Xiaoyantan Village
 Songjiatan Village

See also 
 List of township-level divisions of Gansu

References 

Township-level divisions of Gansu
Geography of Lanzhou
Subdistricts of the People's Republic of China